The Patriotic Front (colloquially known as "The Patriots") is a political party in Trinidad and Tobago. The party was founded on May 25, 2019 by former UNC member of parliament Mickela Panday, daughter of Basdeo Panday, to contest the 2020 Trinidad and Tobago general election. The Patriots currently do not hold any seats in the House of Representatives, Regional municipalities, Regional corporations or in the Tobago House of Assembly.

References

External links
 Patriotic Front

Political parties in Trinidad and Tobago
Political parties established in 2019
Left-wing nationalist parties